Walter Kingsford (born Walter Pearce; 20 September 1881 – 7 February 1958) was an English stage, film, and television actor.

Early years 
Kingsford was born in Redhill, Surrey, England.

Career
Kingsford began his acting career on the London stage. He also had a long Broadway career, appearing in plays from the 1912 original American production of George Bernard Shaw's Fanny's First Play to 1944's Song of Norway.

In the early 1920s, Kingford was active with the Henry Jewett Players.

Kingsford moved to Hollywood, California, for a prolific film career in supporting parts. On screen, he specialised in portraying authority figures such as noblemen, heads of state, doctors, police inspectors and lawyers. He is best known for his recurring role as the snobbish hospital head Dr. P. Walter Carew in the popular Dr. Kildare (and Dr. Gillespie) film series. 

Kingsford had numerous television appearances in the 1950s. They included TV Reader's Digest, Command Performance and Science Fiction Theatre.

Personal life
Kingsford was married to actress Winifred Hanley. They had a son, Guy Kingsford.

Kingsford died of a heart attack in Hollywood in 1958, aged 76. He was cremated and his ashes scattered on the grounds of Grand View Memorial Park Cemetery in Glendale, California.

Complete filmography

Sherlock Holmes (1922) as Gunman at apartment window (uncredited)
Outward Bound (1930) as The Policeman (uncredited)
The Trans-Atlantic Mystery (1932, Short) as Dodge - Miller's Valet (uncredited)
The Pursuit of Happiness (1934) as Rev. Lyman Banks
The President Vanishes (1934) as Martin Drew
The White Cockatoo (1935) as Marcus Lovscheim
The Mystery of Edwin Drood (1935) as Hiram Grewgious
Naughty Marietta (1935) as Don Carlos
Shanghai (1935) as Hilton
The Melody Lingers On (1935) as Croce
I Found Stella Parish (1935) as Reeves
A Tale of Two Cities (1935) as Victor (uncredited)
Professional Soldier (1935) as Christian Ledgard
The Invisible Ray (1936) as Sir Francis Stevens
The Story of Louis Pasteur (1936) as Napoleon III
The Music Goes 'Round (1936) as Cobham
Little Lord Fauntleroy (1936) as Mr. Snade
Frankie and Johnny (1936) as Timothy
Speed (1936) as Uncle Edward Emery (uncredited)
Trouble for Two (1936) as Malthus
Hearts Divided (1936) as Pichon
Meet Nero Wolfe (1936) as Emanuel Jeremiah (E.J.) Kimball
Anthony Adverse (1936) as Minor Role (uncredited)
Mad Holiday (1936) as Ben Kelvin
Bulldog Drummond Escapes (1937) as Stanton
Stolen Holiday (1937) as Francis Chalon
Maytime (1937) as Mr. Rudyard
Captains Courageous (1937) as Dr. Finley
The League of Frightened Men (1937) as Ferdinand Bowen
The Devil is Driving (1937) as Louis Wooster
It Could Happen to You (1937) as Prof. Schwab
The Life of Emile Zola (1937) as Colonel Sandherr
Double or Nothing (1937) as Mr. Dobson
My Dear Miss Aldrich (1937) as Mr. Talbot
Behind the Criminal (1937, Short) as Robert Carver
I'll Take Romance (1937) as William Kane
Algiers (1938) as Louvain
Paradise for Three (1938) as William Reichenbach
A Yank at Oxford (1938) as Dean Williams
There's Always a Woman (1938) as Grigson
The Lone Wolf in Paris (1938) as Grand Duke Gregor de Meyerson
The Toy Wife (1938) as Judge Rondell
Lord Jeff (1938) as Superintendent
The Young in Heart (1938) as Inspector
Carefree (1938) as Dr. Powers
If I Were King (1938) as Tristan l'Hermite
Young Dr. Kildare (1938) as Dr. P. Walter Carew
Say It in French (1938) as Hopkins
Smashing the Spy Ring (1938) as Dr. L.B. Carter
Juarez (1939) as Prince Richard Metternich
Calling Dr. Kildare (1939) as Dr. 'Walter' Carew,
The Man in the Iron Mask (1939) as Colbert
Miracles for Sale (1939) as Colonel Watrous
The Witness Vanishes (1939) as Amos Craven
Dancing Co-Ed (1939) as President Cavendish
The Secret of Dr. Kildare (1939) as Dr.'Walter' Carew
Adventure in Diamonds (1940) as Wakefield
Star Dust (1940) as Napoleon in Screen Test
Dr. Kildare's Strange Case (1940) as Dr. 'Walter' Carew, Hospital Administrator
Lucky Partners (1940) as Wendell
Dr. Kildare Goes Home (1940) as Dr. 'Walter' Carew
A Dispatch from Reuter's (1940) as Napoleon III
Dr. Kildare's Crisis (1940) as Dr. 'Walter' Carew
Kitty Foyle (1940) as Mr. Kennett
The Lone Wolf Takes a Chance (1941) as Dr. Hooper Tupman
The Devil and Miss Jones (1941) as Mr. Allison
The People vs. Dr. Kildare (1941) as Dr. 'Walter' Carew
Hit the Road (1941) as Colonel Smith
Ellery Queen and the Perfect Crime (1941) as Henry
Dr. Kildare's Wedding Day (1941) as Dr. 'Walter' Carew
The Corsican Brothers (1941) as Monsieur Dupre
Unholy Partners (1941) as Mr. Peck - Managing Editor
H. M. Pulham, Esq. (1941) as The Skipper (uncredited)
Fly-by-Night (1942) as Heydt
Dr. Kildare's Victory (1942) as Dr. 'Walter' Carew
My Favorite Blonde (1942) as Dr. Wallace Faber
Fingers at the Window (1942) as Dr. Cromwall
Calling Dr. Gillespie (1942) as Dr. 'Walter' Carew
The Loves of Edgar Allan Poe (1942) as T.W. White
Dr. Gillespie's New Assistant (1942) as Dr. 'Walter' Carew
Forever and a Day (1943) as Estate Lawyer
Flight for Freedom (1943) as Admiral Graves
Dr. Gillespie's Criminal Case (1943) as Dr. 'Walter' Carew
Mr. Lucky (1943) as Commissioner Hargraves
Don't You Believe It (1943, Short) as George Washington (uncredited)
Bomber's Moon (1943) as Prof. Frederich Mueller
Hi Diddle Diddle (1943) as Senator Jummy Simpson
The Hitler Gang (1944) as Franz von Papen
Mr. Skeffington (1944) as Dr. Melton (uncredited)
Three Men in White (1944) as Dr. Walter Carew
Ghost Catchers (1944) as Chambers (uncredited)
Secrets of Scotland Yard (1944) as Roylott Bevan
Between Two Women (1945) as Dr. Walter Carew
The Black Arrow (1948) as Sir Oliver Oates
The Velvet Touch (1948) as Peter Gunther
Slattery's Hurricane (1949) as R.J. Milne
Experiment Alcatraz (1950) as Dr. J.P. Finley
Kim (1950) as Dr. Bronson (uncredited)
Tarzan's Peril (1951) as Barney
Soldiers Three (1951) as Fairfax (uncredited)
My Forbidden Past (1951) as Coroner
Two-Dollar Bettor (1951) as Carleton P. Adams
The Desert Fox: The Story of Rommel (1951) as Vice-Adm. Friedrich Ruge (uncredited)
Confidence Girl (1952) as Mr. Markwell
The Brigand (1952) as Sultan of Morocco
The Pathfinder (1952) as Col. Duncannon
Loose in London (1953) as Earl of Walsingham
Walking My Baby Back Home (1953) as Uncle Henry Hall
Wonder Valley (1953) as Elderly Writer
Casanova's Big Night (1954) as Minister (uncredited)
Flight from Cathay (1954, TV Movie)
Dynamite, the Story of Alfred Nobel (1954, TV Movie)
The Search for Bridey Murphy (1956) as Professor
Around the World in 80 Days (1956) as Captain of the 'Mongolia' (uncredited)
Merry Andrew (1958) as Mr. Fairchild (final film role)

References

External links

1881 births
1958 deaths
People from Redhill, Surrey
20th-century English male actors
English male stage actors
English male film actors
English male television actors
British expatriate male actors in the United States
Burials at Grand View Memorial Park Cemetery
English emigrants to the United States